Maroo Entertainment is a South Korean entertainment company established in 2010. The company operates as a talent agency, music production and distribution company, and film/drama production company. The company currently manages singer and actor Park Ji-hoon and idol group Ghost9.

History
Maroo Entertainment was firstly active as a Mnet Media music label in 2007, debuting boy group Supernova.

In July 2010, Maroo Entertainment officially registered as a legal independent company.

In 2012, former SeeYa member Kim Yeon-ji joined Maroo as a soloist.

In February 2014, Maroo debuted their first girl group 1PS. In May 2014, OneTwo member Song Ho-beom joined Maroo.

In February 2015, former LPG member Han Young, joined Maroo. In May 2015, actor Ha Seok-jin joined Maroo. Maroo debuted their second girl group myB in August 2015. On October 21, 2015, singer and entertainer Kim Jong-kook joined Maroo.

On December 28, 2016, former The Ark member Euna Kim joined Maroo.

On January 1, 2017, Maroo debuted their third girl group BONUSBaby. On June 14, 2017, Park Ji-hoon officially signed a contract with Maroo. On August 4, 2017, actress Bae Geu-rin joined Maroo.

On May 23, 2018, Maroo debuted former The Ark member Euna Kim and Minju as the duo KHAN. Later that month, Norazo member Jo Bin joined Maroo. On August 21, 2018, Norazo made a comeback under Maroo after adding new member Won Heum. On September 10, 2018, Maroo announced that BONUSbaby member Kongyoo would leave the group to focus on her studies, and that the group will take a hiatus.

On September 18, 2019, Maroo debuted Produce X 101 trainees Lee Jin-woo, Lee Tae-seung  and Lee Woo-jin as Teen Teen.

On September 23, 2020, Maroo debuted their new boy group Ghost9.

In June 2022, IHQ acquired 47.14% of the company shares.

Artists 
Source:

Recording artists 

Groups
 Ghost9

Duets
 Norazo

Soloists
 Park Ji-hoon

Former artists

Former recording artists
 Kim Yeon-ji (2012–2017)
 1PS (2014–2015)
 Song Ho-beom (2014–????)
 Han Young (2015–2018)
 MyB (2015–2016)
 Jookyung (2015–2016)
 Heejoo (2015–2016)
 U-Jung (2015–2016)
 G-won (2015–2016)
 ASHGRAY (2016)
 Supernova (2007–2018)
 BONUSBaby (2017–2020)
 Kongyoo (2017–2018)
 KHAN (2018–2019)

Former entertainers
 Kim Jong-kook (2015–2018)

Former actors
 Ha Seok-jin (2015–2018)
 Bae Geu-rin (2017)
 Kwon Yohan (2018–????)
 Lee Sang-mi (2018–????)
 Seo Eun-chae
 Dabee
 Choi Moon-hee
 Kwon Seung-woo

References

External links
 

South Korean companies established in 2007
Companies based in Seoul
Record labels established in 2007
South Korean record labels
K-pop record labels
Music publishing companies of South Korea
Talent agencies of South Korea